Harry Webber (21 April 1936 – 3 December 2013) was a South African weightlifter. He competed in the men's lightweight event at the 1960 Summer Olympics.

References

1936 births
2013 deaths
Bulgarian male weightlifters
Olympic weightlifters of South Africa
Weightlifters at the 1960 Summer Olympics
Sportspeople from Pietermaritzburg
Commonwealth Games medallists in weightlifting
Commonwealth Games silver medallists for South Africa
Weightlifters at the 1958 British Empire and Commonwealth Games
Medallists at the 1958 British Empire and Commonwealth Games